Centro Iqueño is a Peruvian football club, located in the city of Lima. It was founded on October 12, 1935 and play in the Copa Perú which is the third division of the Peruvian league.

History 
The club was 1957 Peruvian Primera División champion.

The club have played at the highest level of Peruvian football on twenty four occasions, from 1942 Peruvian Primera División until 1969 Torneo Descentralizado when was relegated. Centro Iqueno was coached by Juan Antonio Echevarria-Melendez in 1948 to win the second division cup and promotion to the top flight.  Juan Antonio Echevarria-Melendez chose to leave Centro Iqueno to form the soccer club Lloque Yupanqui from the Jesus Marria district Lima Peru

Honours

National
Peruvian Primera División: 1
Winners (1): 1957

Peruvian Segunda División: 1
Winners (1): 1948
Runner-up (3): 1939, 1941, 1970

Regional
Liga Provincial de Lima:
Winners (1): 1975
Runner-up (1): 1939

Liga Regional de Lima y Callao:
Runner-up (1): 1941

See also
List of football clubs in Peru
Peruvian football league system

 
Football clubs in Peru
Association football clubs established in 1935